Die Jungfrau auf dem Dach (English translation: "The Virgin on the Roof") is a 1953 American comedy film produced and directed by Otto Preminger. The screenplay by Carl Zuckmayer is a German language translation of the script for The Moon Is Blue by F. Hugh Herbert, based on his 1951 play.

Plot
A comedy of manners, the film centers on virtuous actress Patty O'Neill, who meets playboy architect Donald Gresham on the observation deck of the Empire State Building and accepts his invitation to join him for drinks and dinner in his apartment. There she meets Donald's upstairs neighbors, his ex-fiancée Cynthia and her father, roguish David Slader. Both men are determined to bed the young woman, but they quickly discover Patty is more interested in engaging in spirited discussions about the pressing moral and sexual issues of the day than surrendering her virginity to either one of them. After resisting their amorous advances throughout the night, Patty leaves and returns to the Empire State Building, where Donald finds her and proposes marriage.

Production
Otto Preminger had directed the 1951 Broadway production of F. Hugh Herbert's play The Moon Is Blue, and its successful run of 924 performances prompted him to contract with United Artists to finance and distribute a screen adaptation over which he would have complete control. He deferred his producer's and director's salaries in exchange for 75% of the film's profits.

Since Herbert's play had been a huge success in Germany, Preminger decided to film English- and German-language versions simultaneously, using the same sets and the same crew but different casts. The director estimated this method would increase the filming schedule by only eight to ten days and production costs by only 10 to 15 percent. The budget for both films was $373,445.
After ten days of rehearsals for each of his casts, Preminger began principal photography of both films on January 21, 1953, filming an English language scene and then its German equivalent in quick succession. Johanna Matz and Hardy Krüger, the stars of the German adaptation, briefly appear in the English-language version as the young couple waiting to use the coin-operated telescope at the top of the Empire State Building, cameo roles William Holden and Maggie McNamara of the American cast play in the German version.

In later years, Preminger stated he much preferred The Moon Is Blue to Die Jungfrau auf dem Dach because he felt the psychology of the plot did not translate well.

Cast
Hardy Krüger as Donald Gresham 
Johannes Heesters as David Slater 
Johanna Matz as Patty O'Neill 
Sig Ruman as Michael O'Neill 
Dawn Addams as Cynthia Slater

References

External links

1953 films
American comedy films
American films based on plays
Films set in New York City
American black-and-white films
Films directed by Otto Preminger
Films scored by Herschel Burke Gilbert
American multilingual films
United Artists films
1950s multilingual films
1953 comedy films
1950s American films